Ostojić or Ostoić is a South Slavic surname derived from a masculine given name Ostoja. It may refer to:

 Arsen Anton Ostojić (born 1965), Croatian film director
 Bojan Ostojić (born 1984), Serbian football player
 Đuro Ostojić (born 1976), Montenegrin professional basketball player
 Esteban Ostojich (born 1982), Uruguayan football referee
 Ljubica Ostojić (1945–2021), writer and poet from Bosnia-Herzegovina
 Néstor Kirchner Ostoić (1950–2010), Argentine politician
 Predrag Ostojić (1938–1996), Yugoslav chess Grandmaster
 Radivoje Ostojić, Yugoslav basketball player
 Rajko Ostojić (born 1962), Croatian politician
 Stephen Ostojić of Bosnia, King of Bosnia from 1418 to 1421
 Stevan Ostojić (born 1941), Serbian football player, as forward and also football manager
 Tanja Ostojić (born 1972), Serbian feminist performance artist
 Zaharije Ostojić (1907–1945), Montenegrin Serb Chetnik commander

Croatian surnames
Serbian surnames